The following is a list of notable restaurant chains in India, including fast food and casual dining restaurant chains.

Fast food

Indian
  Restaurants, Snacks and Sweets
 
 
 
 
 
 
 
 
 
 
 
 
 
 
 
 
 
 
 
 
 
 
 
 
 
 Rebel Foods - Indian online restaurant 
 
 

 
 Tibbs Frankie - Indian quick-service chain

International

Casual dining

Indian 
 
 
 
 
 
 Mainland China - Chinese restaurant chain

International

References

 
India
Restaurant
Restaurant chains
Fast food
Indian fast food